In the philosophy of mathematics, intuitionism, or neointuitionism (opposed to preintuitionism), is an approach where mathematics is considered to be purely the result of the constructive mental activity of humans rather than the discovery of fundamental principles claimed to exist in an objective reality. That is, logic and mathematics are not considered analytic activities wherein deep properties of objective reality are revealed and applied, but are instead considered the application of internally consistent methods used to realize more complex mental constructs, regardless of their possible independent existence in an objective reality.

Truth and proof 

The fundamental distinguishing characteristic of intuitionism is its interpretation of what it means for a mathematical statement to be true. In Brouwer's original intuitionism, the truth of a mathematical statement is a subjective claim: a mathematical statement corresponds to a mental construction, and a mathematician can assert the truth of a statement only by verifying the validity of that construction by intuition. The vagueness of the intuitionistic notion of truth often leads to misinterpretations about its meaning. Kleene formally defined intuitionistic truth from a realist position, yet Brouwer would likely reject this formalization as meaningless, given his rejection of the realist/Platonist position. Intuitionistic truth therefore remains somewhat ill-defined. However, because the intuitionistic notion of truth is more restrictive than that of classical mathematics, the intuitionist must reject some assumptions of classical logic to ensure that everything they prove is in fact intuitionistically true. This gives rise to intuitionistic logic.

To an intuitionist, the claim that an object with certain properties exists is a claim that an object with those properties can be constructed. Any mathematical object is considered to be a product of a construction of a mind, and therefore, the existence of an object is equivalent to the possibility of its construction. This contrasts with the classical approach, which states that the existence of an entity can be proved by refuting its non-existence. For the intuitionist, this is not valid; the refutation of the non-existence does not mean that it is possible to find a construction for the putative object, as is required in order to assert its existence. As such, intuitionism is a variety of mathematical constructivism; but it is not the only kind.

The interpretation of negation is different in intuitionist logic than in classical logic. In classical logic, the negation of a statement asserts that the statement is false; to an intuitionist, it means the statement is refutable.
There is thus an asymmetry between a positive and negative statement in intuitionism. If a statement P is provable, then P certainly cannot be refutable. But even if it can be shown that P cannot be refuted, this does not constitute a proof of P. Thus P is a stronger statement than not-not-P.

Similarly, to assert that A or B holds, to an intuitionist, is to claim that either A or B can be proved. In particular, the law of excluded middle, "A or not A", is not accepted as a valid principle.  For example, if A is some mathematical statement that an intuitionist has not yet proved or disproved, then that intuitionist will not assert the truth of "A or not A". However, the intuitionist will accept that "A and not A" cannot be true. Thus the connectives "and" and "or" of intuitionistic logic do not satisfy de Morgan's laws as they do in classical logic.

Intuitionistic logic substitutes constructability for abstract truth and is associated with a transition from the proof of model theory to abstract truth in modern mathematics. The logical calculus preserves justification, rather than truth, across transformations yielding derived propositions. It has been taken as giving philosophical support to several schools of philosophy, most notably the Anti-realism of Michael Dummett. Thus, contrary to the first impression its name might convey, and as realized in specific approaches and disciplines (e.g. Fuzzy Sets and Systems), intuitionist mathematics is more rigorous than conventionally founded mathematics, where, ironically, the foundational elements which Intuitionism attempts to construct/refute/refound are taken as intuitively given.

Infinity 

Among the different formulations of intuitionism, there are several different positions on the meaning and reality of infinity.

The term potential infinity refers to a mathematical procedure in which there is an unending series of steps. After each step has been completed, there is always another step to be performed. For example, consider the process of counting: 

The term actual infinity refers to a completed mathematical object which contains an infinite number of elements. An example is the set of natural numbers, 

In Cantor's formulation of set theory, there are many different infinite sets, some of which are larger than others. Any infinite set that can be placed in one-to-one correspondence with the natural numbers is said to be "countable" or "denumerable". Infinite sets larger than this are said to be "uncountable".

Cantor's set theory led to the axiomatic system of Zermelo–Fraenkel set theory (ZFC), now the most common foundation of modern mathematics. Intuitionism was created, in part, as a reaction to Cantor's set theory.

Modern constructive set theory includes the axiom of infinity from ZFC (or a revised version of this axiom) and the set  of natural numbers. Most modern constructive mathematicians accept the reality of countably infinite sets (however, see Alexander Esenin-Volpin for a counter-example).

Brouwer rejected the concept of actual infinity, but admitted the idea of potential infinity.
"According to Weyl 1946, 'Brouwer made it clear, as I think beyond any doubt, that there is no evidence supporting the belief in the existential character of the totality of all natural numbers ... the sequence of numbers which grows beyond any stage already reached by passing to the next number, is a manifold of possibilities open towards infinity; it remains forever in the status of creation, but is not a closed realm of things existing in themselves. That we blindly converted one into the other is the true source of our difficulties, including the antinomies – a source of more fundamental nature than Russell's vicious circle principle indicated. Brouwer opened our eyes and made us see how far classical mathematics, nourished by a belief in the 'absolute' that transcends all human possibilities of realization, goes beyond such statements as can claim real meaning and truth founded on evidence." (Kleene (1952): Introduction to Metamathematics, p. 48-49)

History 

Intuitionism's history can be traced to two controversies in nineteenth century mathematics.

The first of these was the invention of transfinite arithmetic by Georg Cantor and its subsequent rejection by a number of prominent mathematicians including most famously his teacher Leopold Kronecker—a confirmed finitist.

The second of these was Gottlob Frege's effort to reduce all of mathematics to a logical formulation via set theory and its derailing by a youthful Bertrand Russell, the discoverer of Russell's paradox. Frege had planned a three volume definitive work, but just as the second volume was going to press, Russell sent Frege a letter outlining his paradox, which demonstrated that one of Frege's rules of self-reference was self-contradictory.  In an appendix to the second volume, Frege acknowledged that one of the axioms of his system did in fact lead to Russell's paradox.

Frege, the story goes, plunged into depression and did not publish the third volume of his work as he had planned. For more see Davis (2000) Chapters 3 and 4: Frege: From Breakthrough to Despair and Cantor: Detour through Infinity. See van Heijenoort for the original works and van Heijenoort's commentary.

These controversies are strongly linked as the logical methods used by Cantor in proving his results in transfinite arithmetic are essentially the same as those used by Russell in constructing his paradox. Hence how one chooses to resolve Russell's paradox has direct implications on the status accorded to Cantor's transfinite arithmetic.

In the early twentieth century L. E. J. Brouwer represented the intuitionist position and David Hilbert the formalist position—see van Heijenoort. Kurt Gödel offered opinions referred to as Platonist (see various sources re Gödel). Alan Turing considers:
"non-constructive systems of logic with which not all the steps in a proof are mechanical, some being intuitive". (Turing 1939, reprinted in Davis 2004, p. 210) Later, Stephen Cole Kleene brought forth a more rational consideration of intuitionism in his Introduction to Metamathematics (1952).

Nicolas Gisin is adopting intuitionist mathematics to reinterpret quantum indeterminacy, information theory and the physics of time.

Contributors 
 Henri Poincaré (preintuitionism/conventionalism)
 L. E. J. Brouwer
 Michael Dummett
 Arend Heyting
 Stephen Kleene

Branches of intuitionistic mathematics 
 Intuitionistic logic
 Intuitionistic arithmetic
 Intuitionistic type theory
 Intuitionistic set theory
 Intuitionistic analysis

See also 

 Anti-realism
 BHK interpretation
 Brouwer–Hilbert controversy
 Computability logic
 Constructive logic
 Curry–Howard isomorphism
 Foundations of mathematics
 Fuzzy logic
 Game semantics
 Intuition (knowledge)
 Model theory
 Topos theory
 Ultraintuitionism

References

Further reading
"Analysis." Encyclopædia Britannica. 2006. Encyclopædia Britannica 2006 Ultimate Reference Suite DVD 15 June 2006, "Constructive analysis" (Ian Stewart, author)
W. S. Anglin, Mathematics: A Concise history and Philosophy, Springer-Verlag, New York, 1994.
In Chapter 39 Foundations, with respect to the 20th century Anglin gives very precise, short descriptions of Platonism (with respect to Godel), Formalism (with respect to Hilbert), and Intuitionism (with respect to Brouwer).

Martin Davis (ed.) (1965), The Undecidable, Raven Press, Hewlett, NY. Compilation of original papers by Gödel, Church, Kleene, Turing, Rosser, and Post.  Republished as 
 
John W. Dawson Jr., Logical Dilemmas: The Life and Work of Kurt Gödel, A. K. Peters, Wellesley, MA, 1997.
Less readable than Goldstein but, in Chapter III Excursis, Dawson gives an excellent "A Capsule History of the Development of Logic to 1928".

Rebecca Goldstein, Incompleteness: The Proof and Paradox of Kurt Godel, Atlas Books, W.W. Norton, New York, 2005.
In Chapter II Hilbert and the Formalists Goldstein gives further historical context. As a Platonist Gödel was reticent in the presence of the logical positivism of the Vienna Circle. Goldstein discusses Wittgenstein's impact and the impact of the formalists. Goldstein notes that the intuitionists were even more opposed to Platonism than Formalism.

 van Heijenoort, J., From Frege to Gödel, A Source Book in Mathematical Logic, 1879–1931, Harvard University Press, Cambridge, MA, 1967. Reprinted with corrections, 1977. The following papers appear in van Heijenoort:
 L.E.J. Brouwer, 1923, On the significance of the principle of excluded middle in mathematics, especially in function theory [reprinted with commentary, p. 334, van Heijenoort]
 Andrei Nikolaevich Kolmogorov, 1925, On the principle of excluded middle, [reprinted with commentary, p. 414, van Heijenoort]
 L.E.J. Brouwer, 1927, On the domains of definitions of functions, [reprinted with commentary, p. 446, van Heijenoort]
Although not directly germane, in his (1923) Brouwer uses certain words defined in this paper.
 L.E.J. Brouwer, 1927(2), Intuitionistic reflections on formalism, [reprinted with commentary, p. 490, van Heijenoort]
 Jacques Herbrand, (1931b), "On the consistency of arithmetic", [reprinted with commentary, p. 618ff, van Heijenoort]
 From van Heijenoort's commentary it is unclear whether or not Herbrand was a true "intuitionist"; Gödel (1963) asserted that indeed "...Herbrand was an intuitionist". But van Heijenoort says Herbrand's conception was "on the whole much closer to that of Hilbert's word 'finitary' ('finit') that to "intuitionistic" as applied to Brouwer's doctrine".

 
 Arend Heyting: 
 
In Chapter III A Critique of Mathematic Reasoning, §11. The paradoxes, Kleene discusses Intuitionism and Formalism in depth. Throughout the rest of the book he treats, and compares, both Formalist (classical) and Intuitionist logics with an emphasis on the former.

 Stephen Cole Kleene and Richard Eugene Vesley, The Foundations of Intuitionistic Mathematics, North-Holland Publishing Co. Amsterdam, 1965. The lead sentence tells it all "The constructive tendency in mathematics...". A text for specialists, but written in Kleene's wonderfully-clear style.
 Hilary Putnam and Paul Benacerraf, Philosophy of Mathematics: Selected Readings, Englewood Cliffs, N.J.: Prentice-Hall, 1964. 2nd ed., Cambridge: Cambridge University Press, 1983. 
 Part I. The foundation of mathematics, Symposium on the foundations of mathematics
 Rudolf Carnap, The logicist foundations of mathematics, p. 41
 Arend Heyting, The intuitionist foundations of mathematics, p. 52
 Johann von Neumann, The formalist foundations of mathematics, p. 61
 Arend Heyting, Disputation, p. 66
 L. E. J. Brouwer, Intuitionnism and formalism, p. 77
 L. E. J. Brouwer, Consciousness, philosophy, and mathematics, p. 90

 Constance Reid, Hilbert, Copernicus – Springer-Verlag, 1st edition 1970, 2nd edition 1996.
 Definitive biography of Hilbert places his "Program" in historical context together with the subsequent fighting, sometimes rancorous, between the Intuitionists and the Formalists.

 Paul Rosenbloom, The Elements of Mathematical Logic, Dover Publications Inc, Mineola, New York, 1950.
 In a style more of Principia Mathematica – many symbols, some antique, some from German script. Very good discussions of intuitionism in the following locations: pages 51–58 in Section 4 Many Valued Logics, Modal Logics, Intuitionism; pages 69–73 Chapter III The Logic of Propostional Functions Section 1 Informal Introduction; and p. 146-151 Section 7 the Axiom of Choice.

   Jacques Hartong and Georges Reeb, Intuitionnisme 84 (first published in La Mathématique Non-standard, éditions du C.N.R.S.)
 A reevaluation of intuitionism, from the point of view (among others) of constructive mathematics and non-standard analysis.

Secondary references 

 A. A. Markov (1954) Theory of algorithms. [Translated by Jacques J. Schorr-Kon and PST staff] Imprint Moscow, Academy of Sciences of the USSR, 1954 [i.e. Jerusalem, Israel Program for Scientific Translations, 1961; available from the Office of Technical Services, U.S. Dept. of Commerce, Washington] Description 444 p. 28 cm. Added t.p. in Russian Translation of Works of the Mathematical Institute, Academy of Sciences of the USSR, v. 42. Original title: Teoriya algorifmov. [QA248.M2943 Dartmouth College library. U.S. Dept. of Commerce, Office of Technical Services, number OTS 60–51085.]
A secondary reference for specialists: Markov opined that "The entire significance for mathematics of rendering more precise the concept of algorithm emerges, however, in connection with the problem of a constructive foundation for mathematics....[p. 3, italics added.] Markov believed that further applications of his work "merit a special book, which the author hopes to write in the future" (p. 3). Sadly, said work apparently never appeared.

 

 
Epistemology
Constructivism (mathematics)
Philosophy of mathematics

de:Intuitionismus